Celery powder is a dried, ground concentrate prepared from fresh celery that is used as a seasoning and as a food preservative in organic meat products. Several commercial preparations exist, and it can also be made using a food dehydrator. Some celery powders are prepared from celery juice.

Meat curative
Celery powder contains a significant amount of naturally occurring nitrate and is often treated with bacterial cultures to produce nitrite. In the United States, treated celery powder is sometimes used as a meat curing agent in organic meat products, which is allowed per USDA regulations because the nitrate/nitrite is naturally occurring. USDA regulations do not allow artificially added nitrate or nitrite to be used directly in organic food products. Meats cured with celery powder include hot dogs and bacon. Celery powder prepared from celery juice has been shown to have a nitrate content of approximately 2.75%.

See also
 Beau monde seasoning
 Celery salt
 Garlic powder
 List of culinary herbs and spices
 Onion powder

References

External links
 Video: Celery powder in cure meats, dyspelling myths . Pigprogress.net.

Spices
Powders
Celery